Paul Crooks (12 October 1966 – 5 July 2019) was an English footballer who played in the Football League for Stoke City.

Career
Crooks was born in Durham but started his career with Bolton Wanderers. He was signed by Stoke City in 1986 after having never made an appearance for Bolton. He made three substitute appearances for Stoke during the 1986–87 season with all three coming in different competitions. He failed to break into the first team at the Victoria Ground and left for Caernarfon Town. He had a short and unsuccessful spell at Carlisle United and returned to Welsh league football with Rhyl and Bangor City.

Career statistics

References

1966 births
2019 deaths
Sportspeople from Durham, England
Footballers from County Durham
English footballers
Association football forwards
Bolton Wanderers F.C. players
Stoke City F.C. players
Caernarfon Town F.C. players
Carlisle United F.C. players
Rhyl F.C. players
Bangor City F.C. players
Blaenau Ffestiniog Amateur F.C. players
English Football League players